Katarína Brychtová née Šebestová (born 22 May 1967) is a Slovak actress and television presenter.

Filmography 
 1990: Sila lásky (TV film)
 1994: Vášnivé známosti
 2009: ko som prežil  Dobrý synček
 2009: Panelák
 2013: Hlavne, že sa máme radi...

References

External links 

1967 births
Living people
Actors from Bratislava
Slovak film actresses
Slovak television actresses
Slovak stage actresses
20th-century Slovak actresses
21st-century Slovak actresses
Slovak television presenters
Slovak women television presenters